SS Canadian Constructor was a  refrigerated ship built in 1922 by Halifax Shipyards Ltd in Nova Scotia.

The boilers fed a 705 NHP triple expansion steam engine that was built by Tidewater Shipbuilders Ltd of Trois-Rivières, Quebec. Her hull had a 13-ton fore peak tank and a 128-ton aft peak tank.

The ship's first manager was Canadian National Steamships, which set up a one-ship company, Canadian Constructor Ltd, to own her.

In 1939 she was sold to Ernels Shipping Co of London, who registered her in London as SS Argos Hill and her placed under the control of Counties Ship Management. She was damaged in an air attack on Convoy OA 178 in the English Channel on 4 July 1940.

Argos Hill survived and remained in service until after the surrender of Germany, but was destroyed by fire on 7 August 1945 just a week before the surrender of Japan.

Footnotes

Bibliography

Further reading
 
 

Ships built in Nova Scotia
1921 ships
Merchant ships of Canada
World War II merchant ships of the United Kingdom
Ships of Counties Ship Management
Maritime incidents in July 1940
Maritime incidents in August 1945
Ship fires